Termas del Arapey (which means Hot Springs of Arapey) is a resort village in the Salto Department of northwestern Uruguay.

Geography

Population
In 2011 Termas del Arapey had a population of 184 permanent inhabitants.
  
Source: Instituto Nacional de Estadística de Uruguay

Tourism
Termas del Arapey, over the edge of the river, is the oldest establishment of spring waters in the country, and is said to be one of the most prominent destinations of the region, containing the Arapey Thermal Resort. Its hot waters, averaging 39°C are used therapeutically, and the village has numerous facilities with holiday cottages, closed and outdoor swimming pools, surrounded by luscious green gardens. Every Easter, many people from the rest of the country, as well as Argentinians, Brazilians and Paraguayans visit Termas del Arapey for vacation.

References

External links
Site Arapey-Resort-Hotels
Article on Termas del Arapey, Official Portal of the Uruguayan Government
Tourist information for Termas del Arapey
Viajando Por Uruguay, Termas del Arapey
INE map of Termas del Arapey

Populated places in the Salto Department
Spa towns in Uruguay